Čeřenice is a village and administrative part of Sázava in Benešov District in the Central Bohemian Region of the Czech Republic. It has about 80 inhabitants.

References

Neighbourhoods in the Czech Republic
Populated places in Benešov District